Louritz van der Schyff is a South African rugby union player for the  in the Currie Cup. He also plays for the Houston SaberCats in Major League Rugby (MLR). His regular position is centre.

Van der Schyff was named in the  squad for the 2021 Currie Cup Premier Division.

References

South African rugby union players
Living people
Rugby union centres
Blue Bulls players
Year of birth missing (living people)
Lions (United Rugby Championship) players
Houston SaberCats players